Mayo College Ground is a sports venue located in the campus of Mayo College in Ajmer, Rajasthan. It is a sports facilities for students and staff consisting of playing fields for football, hockey and a cricket ground with a view of the Aravali Hills and a beautiful old red sandstone pavilion called Bikaner Pavilion.

The modern glass-backed courts for squash or the historic Fanshawe courts, open to the sky. Mayo College has a nine-hole golf course which was built recently. It also has many basketball courts. There is a standard 400m track. Athletics is one of the major seasonal and coaching sports. There are around 17 tennis courts on the campus. There are 5 all-weather synthetic courts and 4-5 clay courts in the senior school. The junior school has 4 clay courts. The 10m Shooting Range is used by boys and girls (from Mayo Girls) of all classes and is one of the best shooting range available at any school in India.

The ground has hosted 19 first-class match stating in 1926 to 1986 since then the ground has not first-class matches but are regular host under ground matches.

References

External links 
 Mayp College
 cricinfo
 cricketarchive
 wikimapia

Sports venues in Rajasthan
Cricket grounds in Rajasthan
Multi-purpose stadiums in India
Buildings and structures in Ajmer
Sports venues completed in 1875
1875 establishments in India
Football venues in Rajasthan